List of A roads in zone 4 in Great Britain starting north of the A4 and south/west of the A5 (roads beginning with 4).


Single- and double-digit roads

Triple-digit roads
Only roads that have individual articles have been linked in the "Road" column below.

Four-digit roads (40xx)

Four-digit roads (41xx)

Four-digit roads (42xx and higher)

References

 4
 
4